The Amatzinac river also called Tenango is a Mexican river in the states of Morelos and Puebla. It flows south from its spring in the foothills of Popocatépetl and south through the canyon which is also called Amatzinac and reaches the dry plain near Chalcatzingo. It gives waters to the municipalities of Tetela del Volcán, Zacualpan, Temoac and Hueyapan. In dry season the river is little more than a shallow stream but at the end of the rainy season it grows due to the meltwaters from the volcano.

Its name means "little paper river" in the Nahuatl. The river Amatzinac gave its name to a suite of orchestral pieces by Mexican composer José Pablo Moncayo.

References

Geography of Mesoamerica
Rivers of Puebla
Rivers of Morelos